On January 6, 2021, Ashli Babbitt was fatally shot during an attack on the United States Capitol. She was part of a crowd of supporters of U.S. President Donald Trump who breached the United States Capitol building seeking to overturn his defeat in the 2020 presidential election. Babbitt attempted to climb through a shattered window beside a barricaded door into the Speaker's Lobby, which led to her being shot in the left shoulder by a United States Capitol Police (USCP) officer. After a USCP emergency response team administered aid, Babbitt was transported to Washington Hospital Center, where she later died. The USCP deemed the shooting was "lawful and within Department policy" and "potentially saved Members (of Congress) and staff from serious injury and possible death".

Background

Attempts to overturn the 2020 election

After Joe Biden won the 2020 United States presidential election, then-incumbent Donald Trump pursued an aggressive and unprecedented effort to overturn the election, with support and assistance from his campaign, his proxies, his political allies, and many of his supporters. These efforts culminated in the United States Capitol attack on January 6, 2021, the day set for Congressional certification of the Electoral College vote count.

Personal life and viewpoints of Ashli Babbitt 
Babbitt was raised in a mostly apolitical family near San Diego, California. In 2004, she enlisted in the United States Air Force, where she served twelve years; while on active duty, she met her first husband, Staff Sgt. Timothy McEntee.  Babbitt was deployed at least eight times by 2014, including in Afghanistan, Iraq, Kuwait, and Qatar; from 2010, she served in the Air National Guard. Six of her years in service were spent in a "Capital Guardians" unit of the District of Columbia Air National Guard, whose mandate is to defend the Washington D.C. region and quell civil unrest. In 2014 Babbitt served as a "mentor" to less-experienced airmen about to go on their first deployment. She reached the rank of senior airman, a "relatively low rank" for a twelve-year veteran according to The Washington Post.

From 2015 to 2017, near the end of her service, she supplemented her income by working as security at the Calvert Cliffs Nuclear Power Plant in Maryland. There, she met Aaron Babbitt, who would become her second husband. She filed for divorce from her first husband in 2018.

In 2016, she faced criminal charges of reckless endangerment in Maryland after she repeatedly smashed her SUV into a vehicle being driven by a former girlfriend of Aaron Babbitt.  Citing ongoing harassment, the victim obtained multiple judicial orders forbidding Babbitt any contact with her.

In 2018, Babbitt moved back to California with her second husband and they purchased a pool servicing business. She worked there with her brother and several other relatives.

Babbitt voted for Barack Obama at least once: asked by another Twitter user on November 15, 2018 if she had "supported Obama the same way [she] supported Trump?" she replied "[...] yes I did [...] I think Obama did great things... he jacked some s*** up... but I think he did do a lot of good... at a time where we needed him. I voted for him!"  She later registered as a Libertarian.

According to her brother, she became frustrated with such issues as the number of homeless people in San Diego and the difficulties of running a small business. As she struggled professionally, Babbitt came to embrace the radical right. On July 1, 2019, a judge issued a $71,000 judgment against her pool business for failing to repay a loan; around the same time, she supported Donald Trump and started following and promoting conspiracy theories. In November 2019, Babbitt tweeted about Pizzagate, a conspiracy theory that senior Democrats were operating a child sex-trafficking ring. By February 2020, Babbitt publicly supported QAnon, a broader far-right conspiracy theory that expanded Pizzagate's claims by adding the concept of a worldwide cabal of Satan-worshipping child abusers whom Trump is secretly fighting. One customer recalled having stopped doing business with the company in 2020 after Babbitt unexpectedly delivered a political rant over the telephone.

Babbitt was very active on social media through her Twitter handle @CommonAshSense. She did not post much original content: most of her posts were retweets, frequently of messages from conservative and right-wing figures like Michael Flynn and Jack Posobiec, and conservative news sites like Right Side Broadcasting. According to Marc-André Argentino, a researcher working on QAnon and other extremist groups, Babbitt was not "a leader or major influencer within the QAnon movement", and was not involved in selling QAnon-themed merchandise. She has nonetheless tweeted regularly about the conspiracy theory since February 2020. Babbitt posted about 50 times a day on Twitter; on election day, she had posted 77 times.

After the election, Babbitt rejected the results and began supporting the Stop the Steal movement. On January 1, 2021, Babbitt announced plans to travel to DC for January 6.

A central belief among QAnon members is that Trump was planning a massive sting operation on the "cabal", with mass arrests of thousands of cabal members to take place on a day known as "The Storm".  On January 5, 2021, the day before the assault on the Capitol, Babbitt tweeted: "Nothing can stop us....they can try and try but the storm is here and it is descending upon DC in less than 24 hours....dark to light...."

On January 6, prior to her arrival at the Capitol, Babbitt retweeted messages by Trump lawyer and QAnon promoter L. Lin Wood demanding that Vice President Mike Pence, Deputy Attorney General Rod Rosenstein and Supreme Court Chief Justice John Roberts resign and that charges be brought against Pence and Rosenstein.

Capitol attack 

Speaker Pelosi was evacuated from the Capitol complex. It was reported that Vice President Pence had been also evacuated, but he remained in a secure location inside the Capitol.

Rioters occupied the empty Senate chamber while federal law enforcement officers defended the evacuated House floor.

Capitol police were overrun by the rioters.

Shooting during the attempted breach of the Speaker's Lobby
At 2:44p.m., law enforcement was trying to "defend two fronts" to the House Chamber, and "a lot of members [of Congress] and staff that were in danger at the time".  Pipe bombs had been discovered outside the Democratic National Committee and the Republican National Committee, and Capitol Police officers had been warned that many attackers were carrying concealed weapons.

Babbitt, wearing a Trump flag as a cape, was among several dozen rioters who approached the doors to the Speaker's Lobby, adjacent to the House chambers. Three uniformed officers were posted outside the Lobby when they were threatened by the crowd. One member of the mob yelled, "Fuck the Blue" (blue being a reference to the police). One officer guarding the doors told the others "They're ready to roll", and the three officers moved away from the barricaded doors leading to the Speaker's Lobby. No longer impeded by police, one rioter, Zachary Jordan Alam, smashed a glass window beside the doors. On the other side of those doors, many lawmakers and staff were being evacuated by Capitol Police, but some were trapped in the House balcony.

After "he's got a gun" was yelled several times when Lieutenant Michael Byrd aimed his weapon, Babbitt, hoisted by two men, began to climb through the shattered window. She was then shot in the left shoulder by Lieutenant Byrd and fell back among the other protesters. Babbitt had been warned not to proceed through the window:  one witness recalled that "A number of police and Secret Service were saying 'Get back! Get down! Get out of the way!'; [Babbitt] didn't heed the call."

Many rioters immediately began to leave the scene, making room for a Capitol Police emergency response team to get in and administer aid, and Babbitt was transported to Washington Hospital Center where she later died. She was 35 years old. She was unarmed at the time of the shooting.

U.S. Representative Markwayne Mullin (R-OK), a witness to Babbitt's attempted breach, said that  Lieutenant Byrd "didn't have a choice" but to shoot, and that his action "saved people's lives".

The shooting was recorded on several cameras, and footage was widely circulated. John Earle Sullivan, among those who recorded footage of the shooting, was arrested for his role in the attack. Zachary Alam was also arrested for his role in the attack.

Investigation 
Following the routine process for shootings by Capitol Police officers, the Metropolitan Police Department of the District of Columbia and the United States Department of Justice investigated Babbitt's death and made a determination that the shooting was "lawful and within Department policy".  Upon clearing Byrd, USCP released a press statement saying his action "potentially saved Members and staff from serious injury and possible death".

Public remarks by CSPD Officer Lt Byrd 
After being cleared of wrongdoing, Byrd made his name public in an August 2021 interview for NBC News. He said his name had been previously revealed in right-wing media and online forums and that he had received racist (Byrd is African-American) and violent threats, causing him to remain in hiding for several months. Looking back on his January 6 experience, Byrd said: "Once we barricaded the doors, we were essentially trapped where we were. There was no way to retreat. No other way to get out. If they get through that door, they're into the House chamber and upon the members of Congress." He stated that he had pulled the trigger as a "last resort" after the mob of protesters ignored his repeated orders to get back, and that he had no idea at that moment that Babbitt was unarmed and was a woman. Byrd commented: "I know that day I saved countless lives. I know members of Congress, as well as my fellow officers and staff, were in jeopardy and in serious danger. And that's my job".

Reactions
Though they deplored Babbitt's death shortly after the event, few among Republican Members of Congress and conservative media initially claimed any wrongdoing from law enforcement, or suggested that it warranted a backlash. Gradually, though, efforts were made to suggest that Babbitt was a martyr, or at least a patriot who was unjustly killed. Fox News hosts Tucker Carlson, Laura Ingraham and Mark Levin were sympathetic to Babbitt, with Levin understating Babbitt's actions and claiming that she had been just "walking around with the rest". U.S. Representative Paul Gosar (R-AZ) said Babbitt had been "executed", later doubling down on that comment and adding that the police officer had been "lying in wait" and demanding to know his name. This drew a rebuke from representative Liz Cheney, who accused Gosar of "[smearing] the men and women who defended us".  Fringe figures  and far-right extremists  have also cast Babbitt as a martyr or a "freedom fighter".  Democratic strategist Mark Burns said this was a "dangerous development for a Republican Party with members  increasingly comfortable pressing for and defending political violence". Both he and David Frum in The Atlantic compared these efforts to the Nazi glorification of Horst Wessel.

Some QAnon supporters, including Lin Wood, have said that Babbitt is still alive and that her apparent death was a "false flag" operation.

In October 2021, Trump recorded a video message arguing that "There was no reason Ashli should've lost her life that day. We must all demand justice for Ashli and her family". 

Russian President Vladimir Putin condemned the shooting of Babbitt, describing it as an "assassination". Brazilian Foreign Minister Ernesto Araújo called for an investigation into Babbitt's death.

Legacy 
Babbitt's mother, Micki Witthoeft, became politically active following her daughter's death. In July 2021, she appeared at a Donald Trump rally where she was introduced by Paul Gosar and received a standing ovation from the crowd. During the rally, Trump expressed condolences to Witthoeft and acknowledged that Babbitt had died trying to salvage his presidency. Witthoeft later said in an interview that she was writing letters of support to January 6 arrestees and commented that her daughter had "made the ultimate sacrifice to bring attention to a stolen election. Half the country loves her and half the country hates her. It's weird to have your child belong to the world". Babbitt's husband told reporters that he does not want violence done in his wife's name, after being asked about comments made by Michael Braynard, the organizer of the Justice for J6 rally, which was dedicated in part to Babbitt.

Babbitt's name and the circumstances of her death have been invoked by various groups. Shortly after her death, Babbitt's name and image were used widely by extremist groups on social media groups, such as Parler and Telegram, with some using white nationalist and antisemitic themes.

In February 2022, American truckers attempting to emulate the Canadian truckers protests against COVID-19 vaccine mandates told reporters that they were also protesting Babbitt's death along with issues such as COVID-19 restrictions and critical race theory.

See also
Timeline of incidents involving QAnon

References

External links
 Internal documents from DC Metropolitan Police investigation of the shooting, released in response to a FOIA request
 Bellingcat documentation from social media and open source video of Babbitt's movements on January 6 and her ideological shifts

2021 in Washington, D.C.
January 2021 events in the United States
Deaths by firearm in Washington, D.C.
Deaths by person in Washington, D.C.
Deaths related to the January 6 United States Capitol attack
Filmed deaths in the United States
People shot dead by law enforcement officers in the United States
Protest-related deaths